Laureano Atanes (born 10 September 1971) is a Spanish wrestler. He competed in the men's freestyle 52 kg at the 1992 Summer Olympics.

References

1971 births
Living people
Spanish male sport wrestlers
Olympic wrestlers of Spain
Wrestlers at the 1992 Summer Olympics
Sportspeople from Barakaldo
20th-century Spanish people